This is a list of earthquakes in 1949. Only magnitude 6.0 or greater earthquakes appear on the list. Lower magnitude events are included if they have caused death, injury or damage. Events which occurred in remote areas will be excluded from the list as they wouldn't have generated significant media interest. All dates are listed according to UTC time. Three events took up the vast majority of the deaths for 1949. The events happened during a volatile mid year period seismically speaking. Firstly in Tajikistan in July 12,000 were killed. A few weeks later in early August a quake struck Ecuador leaving 6,000 dead. In mid August Turkey suffered from an earthquake leaving another 320 dead. Also in this part of the year was the largest quake, a magnitude 8.2 in Canada.

Overall

By death toll 

 Note: At least 10 casualties

By magnitude 

 Note: At least 7.0 magnitude

Notable events

January

February

March

April

May

June

July

August

September

October

November

December

References

1949
 
1949